Graben is a municipality in the district of Augsburg in Bavaria in Germany.

Transport

References

Augsburg (district)